Andros is a masculine given name.  It can also be a surname. 

Notable people with the name Andros include:

Persons with the given name 
 Andros Antoniadis (born 1939), Cypriot footballer
 Andros Christofi (born 1969), Cypriot football goalkeeper
 Andros Kyprianou (born 1955), Cypriot politician
 Andros Rodriguez, American music producer
 Andros Townsend (born 1991), English professional footballer

Characters with the given name 
 Andros (Power Rangers), from the television series Power Rangers: In Space
 Andros Stark, a Marvel Comics character

Persons with the surname 
 Dee Andros (1924–2003), American football player, coach, and college athletics administrator
 Edmund Andros (1637–1714), English colonial administrator
 Phil Andros, a pen name of Samuel Steward (1909–1993), American author
 Plato Andros (1921–2008), American football player
 Thomas Andros (born 1759), American clergyman